Miguel Gómez Bao (1894 – 17 September 1961) was a Spanish-born Argentine actor of the Golden Age of Argentine cinema. He appeared in films such as Amalia, (1936), Safo, historia de una pasión (1943) and La pequeña señora de Pérez (1944). He also did much work for radio and appeared on Radio El Mundo in the late 1930s.

Selected filmography

 Corazón ante la ley (1929)
 La barra de Taponazo (1932)
 Rapsodia gaucha (1932)
 Streets of Buenos Aires (1934)
 Mañana es domingo (1934) - Peringo
 El alma del bandoneón (1935)
 Puente Alsina (1935)
 Puerto nuevo (1936)
 Loco lindo (1936) - Transpunte
 Amalia (1936)
 Tararira (la bohemia de hoy) (1936)
 ¡Goal! (1936)
 El pobre Pérez (1937)
 Muchachos de la ciudad (1937) - Tomado
 La casa de Quirós (1937)
 Maestro Levita (1938) - Dr.Ferran  
 El canillita y la dama (1939)
 Kilómetro 111 (1938)
 Honeysuckle (1938) - Miguel Salvatierra
 The Life of Carlos Gardel (1939) - Garabito
 24 horas en libertad (1939)
 Una mujer de la calle (1939)
 Caminito de gloria (1939)
 Pinocchio (1940, voice in Spanish dubbed version)
 Confesión (1940)
 Napoleón (1941)
 Canción de cuna (1941)
 La casa de los cuervos (1941)
 En el último piso (1942)
 La mentirosa (1942) - Mariano Zabaleta
 Los chicos crecen (1942)
 Claro de luna (1942)
 Casi un sueño (1943)
 Bambi (1943, voice in Spanish dubbed version)
 Safo, historia de una pasión (1943) - Silvino
 Punto negro (1943)
 La pequeña señora de Pérez (1944) - César Ayala
 Se rematan ilusiones (1944)
 Swan Song (1945) - Mendoza
 La señora de Pérez se divorcia (1945)
 El tercer huésped (1946)
 Con el diablo en el cuerpo (1947)
 30 segundos de amor (1947)
 Una atrevida aventurita (1948)
 Novio, marido y amante (1948)
 La locura de don Juan (1948)
 Un pecado por mes (1949)
 Un hombre solo no vale nada (1949)
 Madre Alegría (1950)
 La doctora Castañuelas (1950)
 Fangio, el demonio de las pistas (1950)
 La mujer del león (1951) - (final film role)

References

External links
 
Miguel Gómez Bao at Cinenacional.com 

Spanish male film actors
Argentine male film actors
1894 births
1961 deaths
Spanish emigrants to Argentina
Naturalized citizens of Argentina